Salvatore Farina (born 18 November 1957) is an Italian Army general, and the current Chief of Army Staff. He previously served as commander of the Kosovo Force, the military attaché at the Embassy of Italy, London, and as the commander of Allied Joint Force Command Brunssum.

Biography 
Salvatore Farina has earned degrees in electrical engineering from the University of Padua, in strategic science from the University of Turin and in international politics and diplomatic relations from the University of Trieste.  He entered the Italian Military Academy of Modena in 1976. He became Chief of Staff of the Italian Army on 27 February 2018.

Personal life 
Salvatore Farina and his wife Amelia Gianna have two adult daughters and three granddaughters.

On 8 March 2020, he had tested positive for SARS-CoV-2, the virus that causes coronavirus disease 2019. He said he felt well and was self-isolating. It was also reported that he will be replaced by Federico Bonato until further notice.

Awards and decorations 
 Knight Grand Cross, Order of Merit of the Italian Republic  – motu proprio, President of the Republic, 1 January 2018
 Officer, Military Order of Italy - Pristina, (Kosovo), September 2013 – September 2014, 9 July 2015

References 

1957 births
Living people
Italian generals
Italian military attachés
Chiefs of Staff of the Italian Army
Knights Grand Cross of the Order of Merit of the Italian Republic
University of Padua alumni
University of Turin alumni
University of Trieste alumni